South Korea competed at the 2018 Winter Olympics in Pyeongchang, from 9 to 25 February 2018, as the host nation. It was represented by 122 competitors in all 15 disciplines (15 sports).

In January 2018, following inter-governmental talks, the teams representing South Korea and North Korea entered the Opening Ceremony marching under the Korean Unification Flag, while in women's ice hockey there was a single united Korean team.

South Korea won a total of seventeen medals – five gold, eight silver and four bronze – making these Games the most successful in South Korea's history in terms of total medals won, and earning the country 7th place in the overall medal table. Thirteen of the medals were won in long-track and short-track speed skating events. For the first time in their history, South Korean athletes also won medals in sliding sports (bobsleigh and skeleton), in a team event (curling) and in a snow event (snowboarding).

Medalists 

The following South Korean competitors won medals at the Games. In the by discipline sections below, medalists' names are bolded.

Records

Competitors 
The following is the list of number of competitors participating at the Games per sport/discipline.

$ Additionally, 23 athletes of the women's ice hockey team formed part of a unified Korea women's team which competed under a different country code (COR).

Alpine skiing 

South Korea qualified a total of two male and two female athletes for alpine skiing.

Mixed

Biathlon 

Based on their Nations Cup ranking in the 2016–17 Biathlon World Cup, South Korea qualified five women and received one men spot.

Bobsleigh 

Based on their rankings in the 2017–18 Bobsleigh World Cup, South Korea qualified three sleds.

* Denotes the driver of each sled

Cross-country skiing 

South Korea qualified a total of two male and two female athletes for cross-country skiing.

Distance

Sprint

Curling

South Korea qualified their men's team (five athletes), their women's team (five athletes), and their mixed doubles team (two athletes).

Summary

Men's tournament

South Korea qualified a men's team as the host country.

Round-robin
South Korea had a bye in draws 3, 7 and 11.

Draw 1
Wednesday, 14 February, 09:05

Draw 2
Wednesday, 14 February, 20:05

Draw 4
Friday, 16 February, 09:05

Draw 5
Friday, 16 February, 20:05

Draw 6
Saturday, 17 February, 14:05

Draw 8
Sunday, 18 February, 20:05

Draw 9
Monday, 19 February, 14:05

Draw 10
Tuesday, 20 February, 09:05

Draw 12
Wednesday, 21 February, 14:05

Women's tournament

South Korea qualified a women's team as the host country.

Round-robin
South Korea had a bye in draws 1, 5 and 9.

Draw 2
Thursday, 15 February, 09:05

Draw 3
Thursday, 15 February, 20:05

Draw 4
Friday, 16 February, 14:05

Draw 6
Saturday, 17 February, 20:05

Draw 7
Sunday, 18 February, 14:05

Draw 8
Monday, 19 February, 09:05

Draw 10
Tuesday, 20 February, 14:05

Draw 11
Wednesday, 21 February, 09:05

Draw 12
Wednesday, 21 February, 20:05

Semifinal
Friday, 23 February, 20:05

Gold Medal Game
Sunday, 25 February, 09:05

Mixed doubles

South Korea qualified a mixed doubles team as the host country.

Draw 1
Thursday, February 8, 9:05

Draw 2
Thursday, February 8, 20:04

Draw 3
Friday, February 9, 8:35

Draw 4
Friday, February 9, 13:35

Draw 5
Saturday, February 10, 9:05

Draw 6
Saturday, February 10, 20:04

Draw 7
Sunday, February 11, 9:05

Figure skating 

South Korea qualified two female figure skaters, based on its placement at the 2017 World Figure Skating Championships in Helsinki, Finland. They additionally qualified one male figure skater as well as an entry in ice dancing through the 2017 CS Nebelhorn Trophy. As hosts, they were given a quota to compete in the pairs event.

Team event

Freestyle skiing 

Aerials

Halfpipe

Moguls

Slopestyle

Ice hockey 

Summary

Men's tournament

South Korea men's national ice hockey team qualified as the host.

Team roster
Men's team event – 1 team of 25 players

Preliminary round

Qualification playoff

Women's tournament

South Korea women's national ice hockey team qualified as the host. In January 2018, it was announced that the South Korean team would be amalgamated with a group of North Korean players to form a single Korean team in the tournament. In this team, at least three North Korean players were selected for each game.

Luge 

Based on the results from the World Cups during the 2017–18 Luge World Cup season, South Korea qualified four sleds.

Mixed team relay

Nordic combined

Short track speed skating

According to the ISU Special Olympic Qualification Rankings, South Korea qualified a full squad of five men and five women each.

Men

Women

Key: AA – Advanced to medal round due to being impeded by another skater; ADV – Advanced due to being impeded by another skater; FA – Qualified to medal round; FB – Qualified to consolation round

Skeleton 

Based on the world rankings, South Korea qualified three sleds.

Ski jumping

Snowboarding 

Freestyle

Parallel

Speed skating

Men

Women

Mass start

Team pursuit

** Did not play.

Notes
Park Je-un took part in two sports: nordic combined and ski jumping.

South Korea did not march at the Parade of Nations. Its delegates marched in the opening ceremony, together with North Korea's delegates, as a unified "Korea" team. South Korean bobsleigher Won Yun-jong along with North Korean ice hockey player Hwang Chung-gum were the flagbearers of this unified Korea team.

See also
South Korea at the 2017 Asian Winter Games
North Korea at the 2018 Winter Olympics
Korea at the 2018 Winter Olympics

References

External links
South Korea at the 2018 Winter Olympics

Nations at the 2018 Winter Olympics
2018